Çamiçi is a village in the Gerger District, Adıyaman Province, Turkey. The village is populated by Kurds of the Culur tribe and had a population of 137 in 2021.

The hamlets of Aşağı Akçalı, Çat, Salkım, Sarap and Şamak are attached to the village.

References

Villages in Gerger District
Kurdish settlements in Adıyaman Province